Orthothelphusa is a genus of crabs in the family Pseudothelphusidae, containing the following species:
 Orthothelphusa holthuisi (Rodríguez, 1967)
 Orthothelphusa roberti (Bott, 1967)
 Orthothelphusa venezuelensis (Rathbun, 1905)

References

Pseudothelphusidae